Simon Sean Nicholas David Austin (born 9 October 1966) is an Australian guitarist, songwriter, producer and sound engineer. Austin was a founding member of Frente! in Melbourne in 1989 with Angie Hart on vocals, Tim O'Connor on bass guitar and Mark Picton on drums. Their top five hits on the Australian Recording Industry Association (ARIA) Singles Chart were "Ordinary Angels" (co-written by Austin and Hart) and " Kelly Street" (both in 1992). Their debut album, Marvin the Album, reached top five on the ARIA Albums Chart in the same year. After Frente! disbanded in 1996, Austin moved into record production and sound engineering.

Biography

Simon is the grandson of Jack Austin (1910–1983), an Australian rules footballer.

References

General
  Note: Archived [on-line] copy has limited functionality.
  Note: [on-line] version established at White Room Electronic Publishing Pty Ltd in 2007 and was expanded from the 2002 edition.

Specific

1966 births
Australian audio engineers
Australian guitarists
Australian male singers
Australian songwriters
Living people
Musicians from Melbourne
Frente! members
Australian male guitarists